Želivsko is a municipality and village in Svitavy District in the Pardubice Region of the Czech Republic. It has about 40 inhabitants.

Administrative parts
The hamlet of Horákova Lhota is an administrative part of Želivsko.

References

Villages in Svitavy District